The August 4, 1963 race at Meadowdale International Raceway was the eighth racing event of the thirteenth season of the Sports Car Club of America's National Sports Car Championship. 

A&B Production Results

References

External links
 Sports Car Graphic magazine Nov 1963
 World Sports Racing Protoytypes
 RacingSportsCars.com
Meadowdale